The Sunda scimitar babbler (Pomatorhinus bornensis) is a species of bird in the family Timaliidae. It is endemic to  Sumatra, Borneo, and Malaysia. The Sunda scimitar babbler and the Javan scimitar babbler being grouped as the chestnut-backed scimitar babbler. Its natural habitats are subtropical or tropical moist lowland forest and subtropical or tropical moist montane forest.

References

Sunda scimitar babbler
Birds of Malesia
Sunda scimitar babbler
Taxa named by Jean Cabanis